Czechoslovakia competed at the 1932 Winter Olympics in Lake Placid, United States.

Cross-country skiing

Figure skating

Nordic combined

Ski jumping

References

Nations at the 1932 Winter Olympics
1932
Olympics, Winter